Labidochromis gigas is a species of cichlid endemic to Lake Malawi where it is only known to occur in areas with rocky substrates around Likoma Island and Chisumulu Island.  This species can reach a length of  SL.  It can also be found in the aquarium trade.

References

gigas
Fish described in 1982
Fish of Lake Malawi
Cichlid fish of Africa
Taxonomy articles created by Polbot